The 18th General Assembly of Nova Scotia represented Nova Scotia between the 1847 and 1851, its membership being set in the August 5th, 1847 Nova Scotia general election.

The Assembly sat at the pleasure of the Governor of Nova Scotia, Sir John Harvey.

This Assembly is noteworthy for many reasons.  It was the first Assembly elected after the adoption of the Simultaneous Polling Bill, which resulted in an election in days, rather than three to four weeks.  It was the first election after the establishment of responsible government.   The government of James W. Johnstone was the first to be defeated in the polls in Nova Scotia, resulting in a want of confidence resolution passing in the House, and the first resignation of a government in the province.  Finally, the Governor asked James B. Uniacke to submit an outline of a new administration, and form the first elected, responsible government in the Province of Nova Scotia.

Division of Seats

Counties
Halifax - Joseph Howe, Henry Y. Mott
Colchester - Samuel Creelman
Pictou - G.R. Young, Andrew Robertson
Cumberland - Stephen Fulton,  R. McGowan Dickie
Hants - William Card, John McDougall
Kings - John C. Hall, Daniel Moore
Annapolis - James W. Johnston
Digby - Francis Bourneuf
Yarmouth - Herbert Huntington
Shelburne - Gilbert McKenna
Queen's - S.P. Freeman and John Campbell
Lunenburg - George Ernst, Henry Mignowitz
Sydney - William A.Henry, James McLeod
Guysborough - W. F. DesBarres, A. McDonald
Cape Breton - James B. Uniacke
Richmond - Chas. F. Harrington
Inverness - William Young, Peter Smyth

Townships
Halifax - James McNab, Lawrence O'C. Doyle
Truro - William Fleming
Fleming's election was overturned and Alexander Lackie Archibald was declared elected in 1848
Onslow - John Crowe
Londonderry - John Wier
Pictou - Henry Blackadar
Amherst - W. W. Bent
Windsor - James D. Fraser
Newport - Ichabod Dimock
Falmouth - James Sangster
Cornwallis - Mayhew Beckwith
Horton - Edward L. Brown
Granville - Stephen S. Thorne
Annapolis - Alfred Whitman
Digby - Charles Budd
Clare - Anselm F. Comeau
Yarmouth  - Thomas Killam
Argyle - John Ryder
Shelburne - Joshua Snow
Barrington - John Homer
Liverpool - William B. Taylor
Lunenburg - John Kedy
Sydney (C.B.) - Edmund M. Dodd
Arichat (C.B.)  - Henry Martell

References
David Allison; "History of Nova Scotia", Bowen, Halifax, 1916. 

18
1847 in Canada
1848 in Canada
1849 in Canada
1850 in Canada
1851 in Canada
1847 establishments in Nova Scotia
1851 disestablishments in Nova Scotia